Henri Xavier François Pierre Crisafulli (29 June 1827, Naples – 5 March 1900, Paris age 62) was a 19th-century French playwright and novelist.

Crisafulli studied at collège Charlemagne in Paris. He made his theatre debut in 1855. In addition to his plays, he also wrote novels in collaboration with Gustave Aimard and translated from Dutch. He is buried at Montmartre Cemetery.

Theatre 
1855: César Borgia, with Édouard Devicque, Théâtre de l'Ambigu
1856: Marie Stuart en Écosse, with Édouard Devicque, Ancien Cirque
1857: Les Deux Faubouriens, with Édouard Devicque
1858: Girofle Giroflà, with Édouard Devicque
1861: Ernest Ramel, with Édouard Devicque, Théâtre du Vaudeville
1863: Le Démon du jeu, Théâtre du Gymnase
1864: Mr et Mme Fernel, from the novel by Louis Ulbach, comédie en vaudeville
1865: Le Passé de M. Jouanne, Gymnase
1866: Le Fou d’en face, one-act comedy
1867: La Chouanne, from the novel by Paul Féval, Ambigu
1868: Les Loups et les Agneaux, five-act comedy
1869: Autour du lac, one-act comedy
1873: Les Postillons de Fougerolles, five-act drama
1873: La Falaise de Penmarck, five-act drama
1875: L’Idole, five-act drama
1876: L’Affaire Coverley, five-act dram
 Lord Harrington, five-act comedy
1879: Les Petites Lionnes, three-act comedy, with Paul Sipière
1879: Le Petit Ludovic, three-act comedy, with Victor Bernard
1881: Le Bonnet de coton, five-act comedy, with Victor Bernard
1881: Les Noces d’argent, play in three acts, with Victor Bernard
1887: Une perle, three-act play
1883: Le Vertigo, opéra bouffe with Henry Bocage.

Short stories and novels 
1866–1867: Les Invisibles de Paris, with Gustave Aimard, 5 vol.
1867: Les Compagnons de la lune, with Gustave Aimard, Amyot, Paris, in-18.
1872: Le Roi Marthe, Bureaux de l’administration du Figaro, Paris, in-8°

Translations 
1878: Max Havelaar, Van der Hoeven en Buys, Rotterdam, 2 vol.

Sources 
 .

External links 
 Henri Crisafulli on Data.bnf.fr

19th-century French dramatists and playwrights
19th-century French novelists
Translators to French
Translators from Dutch
1827 births
1900 deaths
Burials at Montmartre Cemetery
19th-century French translators